Mayen-Koblenz is a district (Kreis) in the north of Rhineland-Palatinate, Germany. Neighboring districts are (from north clockwise) Ahrweiler, Neuwied, Westerwaldkreis, district-free Koblenz, Rhein-Lahn, Rhein-Hunsrück, Cochem-Zell, and Vulkaneifel.

History
The district was created in 1973 when the two districts, Mayen and Koblenz, were merged.

The district has been 'twinned' with the Borough of Waverley in Surrey in southern England since 1982.

Geography
The two main rivers of the district are the Rhine and the Moselle, which join at the Deutsches Eck in Koblenz. In the west of the district are the Eifel mountains. These also include the large lake, the Laacher See, a volcanic caldera formed 12000 years ago.

Coat of arms
The coat of arms combine the elements of the two precursor districts. The tree, a Maie, is taken from the Mayen district. The wavy line represents the two rivers Rhine and Moselle. The crown is a reference to the fact that in Rhens the Councils of Electors took place to choose the emperors and kings of the Holy Roman Empire.

Towns and municipalities

Castles and palaces 
The county has many castles and palaces:

 Eltz Castle, probably the best known German castle
 Trutzeltz Castle near Eltz Castle
 Schloss Bürresheim
 Genovevaburg in Mayen
 Oberburg, Kobern in Kobern with the Romanesque St. Matthew's Chapel
 Niederburg, Kobern in Kobern
 Schloss Liebieg in Gondorf
 Oberburg in Gondorf, family seat of the von der Leyen family
 Thurant Castle above Alken (Mosel)
 Ehrenburg near Brodenbach
 Sayn Castle and Schloss Sayn in Bendorf-Sayn
 Bischofstein Castle on the Moselle near Burgen
 Wernerseck Castle near Ochtendung
 Löwenburg and Philippsburg near Monreal
 Virneburg Castle
 Schloss Bassenheim in Bassenheim
 Namedy Castle in Andernach
 Andernach Castle in Andernach

References

External links

 (German)

 
Districts of Rhineland-Palatinate